= Nicole Schaeren-Wiemers =

Swiss neurobiologist

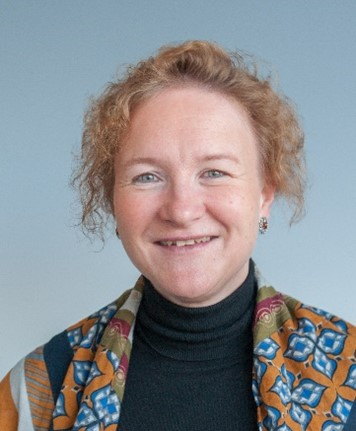
- Schaeren-Wiemers in 2013
- Born: 23 June 1962 (age 64); Switzerland
- Citizenship: Switzerland
- Education: University of Basel
- Known for: Research in Neurobiology
- Scientific career
- Fields: Neurobiology
- Workplaces: ETH Zürich, University of Basel
- Doctoral advisor: H. Eppendorf and M. Schwab

Nicole Schaeren-Wiemers (born 23 June 1962 in Basel) is a Swiss neurobiologist with a focus on myelin. She is research group leader at the Department of Research (DBM) and lecturer for neurobiology at the University of Basel.

== Education ==
Nicole Schaeren-Wiemers studied biochemistry at ETH Zurich. Switzerland. After completing her doctorate In 1995, she joined the Friedrich Miescher Institute (FMI) in Basel, Switzerland as a postdoctoral fellow. Schaeren-Wiemers was Research Group Leader at the Department of Biomedicine at the University of Basel, where she has been researching and teaching as a neurobiologist. In 2004, Schaeren-Wiemers obtained her Habilitation at the Medical Faculty of the University of Basel and in 2007, she was appointed to adjunct professor of neurobiology.

== Research ==
Schaeren-Wiemers investigates the development of the myelin sheath and its preservation and compares it with that in mice, rats and humans. Myelin appears in evolution only in quadrupeds and is conserved structurally as well as at the molecular level including humans. Schaeren-Wiemers identified one of the proteins in myelin, the protein MAL, during her doctoral studies at ETH Zurich. Later work in her own research group at the Department of Biomedicine of the University of Basel, Schaeren-Wiemers showed that MAL is responsible for the apical transport in the myelin sheath. Later studies showed that the function of MAL is crucial for the association of the paranodal loops of the myelin sheaths at the axon with the membrane proteins myelin-associated glycoprotein, peripheral myelin protein 22kD, and nectin like 4. As an example, without MAL the paranodel loops lose contact with the axon. Nicole Schaeren-Wiemers research group characterized that these proteins are altered in humans with CMT1A and in the corresponding animal model. Nicole Schaeren-Wiemers also investigates the molecular changes in the normal appearing white matter (the myelinated axons) of deceased people with multiple sclerosis. Nicole Schaeren-Wiemers discovered that in normal appearing white matter many neuroprotective proteins are highly regulated. The research group of Schaeren-Wiemers was able to develop a suitable animal model.

== Professional career and mission ==
Schaeren-Wiemers was member of the council of the Swiss Society of Neuroscience (SSN) from 2009 to 2010, vice president from 2007 to 2009 and president from 2009 to 2010. Schaeren-Wiemers professionalized the neuroscience community of Switzerland. From 2013 to 2021, she was Chair of the Neuroscience Network of Basel (NNB). This consists of the three faculties (Medicine, Natural Sciences and Psychology), the University Hospital and the UPK, the FMI, the IOB and Neurex as well as the pharmaceutical industry are associated with the NNB. NNB is a scientific network, which enhance the neuroscience in Basel and is involved in the education of master as well as PhD students. The University of Basel contributed substantially in this network, which allows to organize each year the Brain Awareness Week (BAW) Brainweek, a public event.

From 2009 to 2021, Schaeren-Wiemers coordinated the Group II (habilitated and adjunct professors) of the Faculty of Medicine and was elected as member of the Faculty Committee from 2009 to 2021. She played a key role in drawing up and updating the list of members of Group II, which now consists of over 500 habilitated and adjunct professors. In 2013, the members of Group II founded the Association of Lecturers at the University of Basel (DOZUBA), of which Schaeren-Wiemers was the first president. This was a result of the evaluation and performance assessment obligation at all university levels. In the following years, Schaeren-Wiemers managed that a member Group II was given a seat on every Regenz Commission. From 2009 to 2021, Schaeren-Wiemers also organized the elections for a member of Group II for various university committees and was in direct contact with the Rectorate (DOZUBA website). The major goal of DOZUBA is being included in the university statutes; that was achieved by Schaeren-Wiemers at the end of 2020. From 2015 to 2021, she was an elected member of Grouping II of the Faculty of Medicine in the Regenz and was also elected to the Regenz Committee as a representative of all members of Grouping II of the university.

From 2011 to 2021, Schaeren-Wiemers was a member of the Equal Opportunities Commission and was involved in improving the advancement of women in their scientific career. Schaeren-Wiemers was able to contribute to the university's strategy report (2022-2030) in this regard and bring about a binding formulation.

From 2013 to 2021, Schaeren-Wiemers was a member of the Science Award Commission of the City of Basel. This commission consist of two members of each faculty and awards every year the "price of science of the city of Basel". In 2022 Schaeren-Wiemers became member of the evaluation committee of the city of Basel for financial support for young scientist from developed country.

The DBM's Scientific Advisory Board had taken Schaeren-Wiemers as the coordinator of doctoral students at the DBM, which is enrolled at the Faculty of Natural Sciences. She established the "International PhD Program in Biomedicine", which is affiliated with the Faculty of Natural Sciences.

From 2020 to 2021, Schaeren-Wiemers became Vice Dean for the promotion of young scientists at the Faculty of Medicine. On 1 August 2021 Schaeren-Wiemers became Head of the newly created Vice-Rectorate People & Culture. Due to health reason, Schaeren-Wiemers had to step down in 2022, but proceed her scientific research.

== Selected publications ==
=== Research on MAL ===
- Duman, Mert; Jaggi, Stephanie; Enz, Lukas Simon; Jacob, Claire; Schaeren-Wiemers, Nicole (2022). "Theophylline Induces Remyelination and Functional Recovery in a Mouse Model of Peripheral Neuropathy". Biomedicines. 10 (6): 1418. doi:10.3390/biomedicines10061418. PMC 9219657. PMID 35740439.
- Schmid, Daniela; Zeis, Thomas; Sobrio, Monia; Schaeren-Wiemers, Nicole (2014). "MAL Overexpression Leads to Disturbed Expression of Genes That Influence Cytoskeletal Organization and Differentiation of Schwann Cells". ASN Neuro. 6 (5). doi:10.1177/1759091414548916. PMC 4187015. PMID 25290060.
- Buser, A. M.; Schmid, D.; Kern, F.; Erne, B.; Lazzati, T.; Schaeren-Wiemers, N. (2009). "The myelin protein MAL affects peripheral nerve myelination: A new player influencing p75 neurotrophin receptor expression". European Journal of Neuroscience. 29 (12): 2276–2290. doi:10.1111/j.1460-9568.2009.06785.x. PMID 19508690.
- Erne, B.; Sansano, S.; Frank, M.; Schaeren-Wiemers, N. (2002). "Rafts in adult peripheral nerve myelin contain major structural myelin proteins and myelin and lymphocyte protein (MAL) and CD59 as specific markers". Journal of Neurochemistry. 82 (3): 550–562. doi:10.1046/j.1471-4159.2002.00987.x. PMID 12153479.
- Caduff, J.; Sansano, S.; Bonnet, A.; Suter, U.; Schaeren-Wiemers, N. (2001). "Characterization of GFP-MAL expression and incorporation in rafts". Microscopy Research and Technique. 52 (6): 645–655. doi:10.1002/jemt.1049. PMID 11276117.
- Frank, Marcus; Schaeren-Wiemers, Nicole; Schneider, Regula; Schwab, Martin E. (1999). "Developmental Expression Pattern of the Myelin ProteolipiMAL Indicates Different Functions of MAL for Immature Schwann Cells and in a Late Step of CNS Myelinogenesis". Journal of Neurochemistry. 73 (2): 587–597. doi:10.1046/j.1471-4159.1999.0730587.x. PMID 10428054.
- Frank, Marcus; Van Der Haar, Marjan E.; Schaeren-Wiemers, Nicole; Schwab, Martin E. (1998). "RMAL is a Glycosphingolipid-Associated Protein of Myelin and Apical Membranes of Epithelial Cells in Kidney and Stomach". The Journal of Neuroscience. 18 (13): 4901–4913. doi:10.1523/JNEUROSCI.18-13-04901.1998. PMC 6792556. PMID 9634556.
- Schaeren-Wiemers, N.; Valenzuela, DM; Frank, M.; Schwab, ME (1995). "Characterization of a rat gene, rMAL, encoding a protein with four hydrophobic domains in central and peripheral myelin". The Journal of Neuroscience. 15 (8): 5753–5764. doi:10.1523/JNEUROSCI.15-08-05753.1995. PMC 6577631. PMID 7643216.
- Schaeren-Wiemers, N.; Schaefer, C.; Valenzuela, D. M.; Yancopoulos, G. D.; Schwab, M. E. (1995). "Identification of New Oligodendrocyte- and Myelin-Specific Genes by a Differential Screening Approach". Journal of Neurochemistry. 65 (1): 10–22. doi:10.1046/j.1471-4159.1995.65010010.x. PMID 7790852.
- Schaeren-Wiemers, Nicole; Gerfin-Moser, Andrea (1993). "A single protocol to detect transcripts of various types and expression levels in neural tissue and cultured cells: In situ hybridization using digoxigenin-labelled cRNA probes". Histochemistry. 100 (6): 431–440. doi:10.1007/BF00267823. PMID 7512949.

=== Research on multiple sclerosis ===
- Enz, Lukas Simon; Winkler, Anne; Wrzos, Claudia; Dasen, Boris; Nessler, Stefan; Stadelmann, Christine; Schaeren-Wiemers, Nicole (2023). "An Animal Model for Chronic Meningeal Inflammation and Inflammatory Demyelination of the Cerebral Cortex". International Journal of Molecular Sciences. 24 (18) 13893. doi:10.3390/ijms241813893. PMC 10531364. PMID 37762198.
- Enz, Lukas Simon; Zeis, Thomas; Schmid, Daniela; Geier, Florian; Van Der Meer, Franziska; Steiner, Guido; Certa, Ulrich; Binder, Thomas Martin Christian; Stadelmann, Christine; Martin, Roland; Schaeren-Wiemers, Nicole (2020). "Increased HLA-DR expression and cortical demyelination in MS links with HLA-DR15". Neurology: Neuroimmunology & Neuroinflammation. 7 (2). doi:10.1212/NXI.0000000000000656. PMC 6943368. PMID 31882398.
- Zeis, T.; Howell, O.W.; Reynolds, R.; Schaeren-Wiemers, N. (2018). "Molecular pathology of Multiple Sclerosis lesions reveals a heterogeneous expression pattern of genes involved in oligodendrogliogenesis". Experimental Neurology. 305: 76–88. doi:10.1016/j.expneurol.2018.03.012. PMID 29596844.
- Zeis, T.; Allaman, I.; Gentner, M.; Schroder, K.; Tschopp, J.; Magistretti, P.J.; Schaeren-Wiemers, N. (2015). "Metabolic gene expression changes in astrocytes in Multiple Sclerosis cerebral cortex are indicative of immune-mediated signaling". Brain, Behavior, and Immunity. 48: 313–325. doi:10.1016/j.bbi.2015.04.013. hdl:10754/552123. PMID 25937052.
- Zeis, Thomas; Probst, Alfonse; Steck, Andreas Johann; Stadelmann, Christine; Brück, Wolfgang; Schaeren-Wiemers, Nicole (2009). "Molecular Changes in White Matter Adjacent to an Active Demyelinating Lesion in Early Multiple Sclerosis". Brain Pathology. 19 (3): 459–466. doi:10.1111/j.1750-3639.2008.00231.x. PMC 8094783. PMID 19016740.
- Zeis, T.; Graumann, U.; Reynolds, R.; Schaeren-Wiemers, N. (2007). "Normal-appearing white matter in multiple sclerosis is in a subtle balance between inflammation and neuroprotection". Brain. 131 (Pt 1): 288–303. doi:10.1093/brain/awm291. PMID 18056737.
